Tiny Pretty Things is an American drama streaming television series based on the novel of the same name by Sona Charaipotra and Dhonielle Clayton, created by Michael MacLennan. It premiered on Netflix on December 14, 2020, and has aired for one season. 

The series revolves around the goings on at a ballet school in Chicago, and focuses on the school's students, instructors, administrators, and benefactors. The dancing in the show is performed by the actors themselves, not doubles.

Critical reaction to the series has been mixed. Official announcement has been made that it will not be continued.

Cast and characters

Main

 Brennan Clost as Shane McRae, an openly gay dancer who is secretly sleeping with his roommate, Oren
 Barton Cowperthwaite as Oren Lennox, a dancer who has an eating disorder and Shane's roommate whom he is secretly sleeping with
 Bayardo De Murguia as Ramon Costa, one of the best choreographers in the world
 Damon J. Gillespie as Caleb Wick, a dancer who is secretly sleeping with Monique, the Archer School of Ballet's director
 Kylie Jefferson as Neveah Stroyer, a dancer from Inglewood, California, who is given a full scholarship at the Archer School of Ballet after a student falls from a rooftop and into a coma
 Casimere Jollette as Bette Whitlaw, a dancer who is living in the shadow of her older sister, Delia, and Oren's girlfriend
 Anna Maiche as Cassie Shore, the dancer who falls from the rooftop and is in a coma 
 Daniela Norman as June Park, Cassie's former roommate and Neveah's roommate
 Michael Hsu Rosen as Nabil Limyadi  a French dancer who is a Muslim, Caleb's roommate, and Cassie's boyfriend
 Tory Trowbridge as Delia Whitlaw, Bette's older sister and a graduate of the Archer School of Ballet; she is living with Costa and is considered a rising star
 Jess Salgueiro as Isabel Cruz, a Chicago Police Department police officer who is investigating Cassie's case
 Lauren Holly as Monique DuBois, the director of the Archer School of Ballet in Chicago, Illinois, who is secretly sleeping with Caleb

Recurring

 Alexandra Bokyun Chun as Maricel Park, June's mother
 Shaun Benson as Topher Brooks, the ballet master at the Archer School of Ballet
 Michelle Nolden as Katrina Whitlaw, Bette and Delia's mother who is part of the Archer School of Ballet's executive committee
 Paula Boudreau as Selena Covey, Monique's secretary
 Jessica Greco as Torri Fuller, the Archer School of Ballet's resident advisor 
 Morgan Kelly as Alan Renfrew, the head of sports medicine at the Archer School of Ballet and Topher's husband
 Clare Butler as Esmé Halterlein
 Araya Mengesha as Tyler Stroyer, Neveah's older brother
 Ashley Coulson as Gwen Resnik
 Nicole Huff as Paige Aquino
 Alex Eling as Matteo Marchetti, Bette's love interest
 Daniel Kash as Sgt. Dan Lavery, Isabel's boss at Chicago Police Department
 Luke Humphrey as Travis Quinn
 Josh Pyman as Dev Ranaweera, Shane's love interest
 Erin Pitt as Laura

Guest
 Karen Robinson as Makayla Stroyer, Neveah's mother who has served time in prison for murder and is looking to make amends.
 Tiler Peck as Sienna Milken
 Emily Skubic as Lindy (uncredited)

Episodes

Production

Development
Insurrection Media, Inc. optioned the source material from HarperCollins and developed the project for a year before getting a series order on August 6, 2019, from Netflix for 10 episodes. The series is created by Michael MacLennan who executive produced alongside Kiliaen Van Rensselaer, Jordanna Fraiberg, Deborah Henderson, Gary Fleder, Gabrielle Neimand, and Carrie Mudd. Felder also directed the first episode of the series. Production companies involved with the series were slated to consist of Insurrection Media and Peacock Alley Entertainment, Inc. The series premiered on December 14, 2020.

Casting
Upon the series order announcement, Lauren Holly, Kylie Jefferson, Casimere Jollette, Daniela Norman, Brennan Clost, Michael Hsu Rosen, Damon J. Gillespie, Bayardo De Murguia, Barton Cowperthwaite, Tory Trowbridge, and Jess Salgueiro were cast as series regulars. On September 20, 2019, Anna Maiche joined the main cast. On December 9, 2020, it was reported a professional ballet dancer, Emily Skubic is set to make her debut guest role in the series.

Filming
Principal photography for the series began on August 6, 2019 and ended on December 3, 2019 in Toronto, Canada.

Reception
On review aggregator Rotten Tomatoes, Tiny Pretty Things received an approval rating of 53% based on 19 critic reviews, with an average rating of 5.38/10. The website's critics consensus reads, "Tiny Pretty Things has some solid moves, but an over-reliance on empty scandal over emotional substance make for unsatisfying viewing." Metacritic gave the series a weighted average score of 47 out of 100 based on 6 critic reviews, indicating "mixed or average reviews".

References

External links
 

2020 American television series debuts
2020s American drama television series
2020s American LGBT-related drama television series
Dance television shows
English-language Netflix original programming
Television series about ballet
Television series about teenagers
Television shows filmed in Toronto
Television shows about drugs
Television shows based on American novels
Television shows set in Chicago